Everything Not Saved Will Be Lost – Part 1 is the fifth studio album by British rock band Foals. It was released on 8 March 2019 through Warner Bros. and Transgressive Records. The album is considered the first half of a two-piece project, being supplemented by their consecutive sixth studio album Everything Not Saved Will Be Lost – Part 2, later released on 18 October 2019. This is their first album not to feature founding member and bassist Walter Gervers since he amicably left the group in 2018.

An alternative version of the album was digitally released 15 September 2019 featuring a compilation of remixes/edits from the band's musical peers and contemporaries (including Metronomy, George FitzGerald, Alex Metric, Purple Disco Machine, etc.) within the realms of EDM, drum & bass, and house music.

The album received a nomination for the prestigious Mercury Prize in July 2019.

Promotion and release
In January 2019, the band released a series of three short teaser clips featuring cinematic vignettes of the yet-to-be-released music video through their social media to announce the release dates of both parts of the album on 8 March 2019 and in autumn 2019 respectively. The third teaser, featuring a group of politicians physically assaulting each other in parliament court and a quick strobed, stylised shot, the band announced the release of the first single "Exits", which debuted on DJ Annie Mac's BBC Radio 1 show on 21 January. In promotion of "Exits", on 16 January, the band's marketing team created a scavenger hunt through social media by posting GPS coordinates along with photos of branded envelopes taped to various doorway exits of public transit and train stations around the world, such as New York, London, Paris, Mexico and Tokyo for fans to collect. The envelopes contained lyrics to "Exits" before its release.

On 14 February, the band premiered the album's second single, "On The Luna" via Annie Mac's BBC Radio 1 show once again. Along with the release, was the announcement of a string of small, warm-up shows in the UK before the start of their 2019 North American & European spring/summer tour. On 25 February, the album's third single "Sunday" premiered via Zane Lowe's Beats 1 radio program.

Album artwork and title
Everything Not Saved Will Be Lost – Part 1 features album artwork from Ecuadorian artist Vicente Muñoz. The image was created using infrared film, which captures infrared signal rather than visible light to contrast vegetation with the built environment. This image is  part of his ongoing series, Sublimis, which explores the inevitable struggle of man against nature in the urban environment.

The album's title is taken from the epigraph of the T. Michael Martin novel The End Games, which claims "Everything not saved will be lost" originated as a "Nintendo 'Quit Screen' message". Although Martin in fact adapted the quote from the Nintendo Wii 'Quit Screen' message: "Anything not saved will be lost". The quote has become a cultural meme, featured on the front page of Reddit many times over, serving as the name and inspiration for several international art exhibits, and shared countless times across all major social media platforms.

Track listing

Personnel
Yannis Philippakis – vocals, guitar, bass, keyboards
Jimmy Smith – guitar, keyboards
Jack Bevan – drums
Edwin Congreave – keyboards, synthesizers, bass

Additional musicians
Duncan Tootill – horns
Sam Scott – horns
Vincent Taeger – percussion
Edith Langley – backing vocals
Jules Rendell – backing vocals
Mica Townsend – backing vocals

Technical personnel
Foals – producers
Brett Shaw – producer, engineering
James Ford – additional production, recording assistant
Tony Allen – additional production
Vincent Taurelle – additional production
Rob Wilks – engineering, programming
Mark "Spike" Stent – mixing 
Michael Freeman – mixing 
Randy Merrill – mastering
Mike Lythgoe – art direction
Vicente Muñoz – artwork photography

Critical reception

Accolades

Charts

Weekly charts

Year-end charts

References

2019 albums
Foals (band) albums
Transgressive Records albums
Warner Records albums
Albums about climate change